The Swedish Seniors was a men's professional golf tournament on the European Seniors Tour in 1997 and 1998. The tournament was held at Fågelbro Golf and Country Club on the Island of Värmdö, east of Stockholm, Sweden.

Winners

References

Former European Senior Tour events
Golf tournaments in Sweden
Recurring sporting events established in 1997
Recurring sporting events disestablished in 1998
1997 establishments in Sweden
1998 disestablishments in Sweden